Edgewood is the debut studio album by American rapper Trouble from Atlanta, Georgia. It was released on March 23, 2018, via Duct Tape Entertainment, Ear Drummer Records and Interscope Records. It was produced entirely by Mike Will Made It who also served as executive producer on the project with some assistance reportedly coming from 30 Roc and Zaytoven. The album features guest appearances from Boosie Badazz, Drake, Fetty Wap, Lil 1, Low Down Dirty Black, Quavo and The Weeknd. It became the first charted rapper's effort, peaking at No. 130 on the US Billboard 200 albums chart.

Track listing

Charts

References

External links
Edgewood at Discogs
Edgewood at iTunes

2018 mixtape albums
Albums produced by TM88
Albums produced by Zaytoven
Albums produced by Mike Will Made It
Mike Will Made It albums
Trouble (rapper) albums